George Bowen (13 July 1875 – 1945) was an English footballer who played as a winger in the Football League for Wolverhampton Wanderers, Liverpool and Burslem Port Vale.

Career
Bowen joined Wolverhampton Wanderers from local non-league side Bridgetown Amateurs in July 1899. He made his first team debut on 25 November 1899 in a 1–1 draw at Liverpool. He scored a brace on his Molineux debut the following week, against Blackburn Rovers, and scored seven in total in his debut season, helping the club reach fourth place in the First Division. After being a first team regular in the following season, he was bought by newly crowned League champions Liverpool in May 1901. He made his Liverpool debut at Anfield on 14 September 1901 in the Merseyside derby against Everton. He retained his place for the following game, against Sunderland however he would never play for the "Reds" again after he suffered a knee injury. He soon returned to Wolves and recovered sufficiently to appear in three successive first team games by early 1903. However, he was unable to play regularly for the club and was allowed to join Burslem Port Vale in August 1904. He made a highly successful debut, scoring in a 2–2 draw with Manchester United at the Athletic Ground on 3 September 1904. He lost his place the next month however, and was released at the end of the season after playing just six Second Division games for the club. He retired from the professional game and worked in a factory in Bilston, while still turning out for various non-league clubs.

Career statistics
Source:

References

1875 births
1945 deaths
Sportspeople from Walsall
English footballers
Association football wingers
Wolverhampton Wanderers F.C. players
Liverpool F.C. players
Port Vale F.C. players
English Football League players